Heart Lake is located in northwestern Minnesota, several miles west of Lake Itasca, which is believed to be the headwaters of the Mississippi River.

Heart Lake comprises about 206 acres (83 hectares), has a maximum depth of 55 feet (17 m), consists of 3.5 miles of shoreline, and is mostly surrounded by private cabins.

References

External links
 Lake information report

Lakes of Clearwater County, Minnesota
Lakes of Minnesota